The 1985 Summer Deaflympics, officially known as the 15th Summer Deaflympics, is an international multi-sport event that was celebrated from July 10 to July 20, 1985, in Los Angeles, California United States.

Sports 

 Athletics
 Badminton
 Basketball
 Cycling
 Football
 Handball
 Shooting
 Swimming
 Table Tennis
 Tennis
 Volleyball
 Water Polo

Medal Tally

References

Deaflympics
International sports competitions hosted by the United States
Sports competitions in Los Angeles
Deaflympics
Deaflympics
Deaflympics
Multi-sport events in the United States
1985 in Los Angeles
July 1985 sports events in the United States
Parasports in the United States